Talat Mahmood (24 February 1924 – 9 May 1998) was an Indian playback singer who is considered one of the popular male Indian film song and ghazal singers. Although he tried his luck as a film actor, he did not succeed a great deal in acting.

Talat Mahmood received the Padma Bhushan award in 1992, in recognition of his artistic contributions in the spheres of cinematic and ghazal music.

He was particularly famous for singing soft and sombre ghazals in his quivering and silky voice. Romantic and tragic were the moods he liked most and it was he who helped a great deal in shaping the style and method of modern ghazal singing in India during the 1950s and 1960s.

Early life 
Talat Mahmood was born in Lucknow, Uttar Pradesh, India to Manzoor Mahmood. Talat showed his musical leanings from a very young age and would enjoy sitting through all-night music concerts.

Coming from a conservative Muslim background, singing was not encouraged. Talat had to choose between working in films and continue living at home. Despite his parents objection, he opted for the films, though his family accepted the fact only about a decade later when he gained some respect in the Indian film industry.

Singing career 
Talat apprenticed classical music under Pandit S.C.R. Bhat at Marris College of Music, Lucknow (presently Bhatkhande Music Institute) some time in the late 1930s. Talat Mahmood began his singing career at the age of 16 in 1939, when he began singing the Ghazals of Daag, Mir, Jigar etc. on All India Radio, Lucknow. His voice had a quality distinct from all the other singers. HMV was quick to notice this and offered Talat his first disc in 1941 Sab din ek samaan nahin tha, Bun jaoon ga kya se kya main, Iska to kuch dhyan nahin tha.

His reputation as a ghazal singer was not limited to his hometown of Lucknow, but it reached the city that proved to shape his destiny – Calcutta. The then famous ghazal singers were Barkat Ali Khan, K.L. Saigal and M.A. Rauf. The classical songs he sang were "Sapnon Ki Suhaani Duniyaa Ko" for film Shikast and "Laage Tose Naina" for Chaandi Ki Deewar.

In 1944, he sang the popular hit Tasveer teri dil mera behela nah sake gi. This disc brought Talat the fame throughout India and soon he was beckoned by the Calcutta film industry. Talat made cameo appearances and starred in about 16 films, for both the Calcutta (film hub of the 1940s) and Bombay Film Industry. The three films in which he starred were regional hits in Calcutta. Initially, in Calcutta, he recorded a lot of Bangla songs (basic album) under the assumed name of "Tapan Kumar".

In 1949, Talat moved to Bombay, to sing for the Hindi film industry. His big break came with the song Ae dil mujhe aisi jagha le chal jahan koi na ho composed by music director Anil Biswas, his mentor in Bombay, for the soundtrack of the film Arzoo (1950 film).

Laxmikant Pyarelal composed a melodious duet with Lata Mangeshkar in 1971 film Woh Din Yaad Karo, this happened to be his last song in Hindi films.  Later he was heard in an Urdu Movie, Vale-E Azam in 1987, along with Hemlata.

Commemorative postage stamp

India Post issued a commemorative postage stamp to honor him in 2016.

Acting career 
Talat Mahmood acted in over a dozen films with actresses of the time like Nutan, Mala Sinha, Suraiya and others. Later he decided to give up acting to concentrate on singing.

Talat acted in the following Hindi films:

The advent of rock-n-roll music in the late 1960s sidelined singers like Talat. As long as he was top box-office draw, the film producers insisted on including his songs in their films. Talat's velvety vocals posed a special challenge to the music-composers, most of whom leaned towards the deep baritones of Mohammad Rafi and Mukesh. The resultant demise of his film career led to the decline of his singing career. At the same time, the social changes and happiness brought about by increasing prosperity in India meant that blue mood ghazals and heart-rending ballads were not popular any more. Talat continued to record good songs, but less in number. His last soundtrack recording, in 1985, is the song "Mere Shareek-e-Safar", a duet sung with  Hemlata, from the film "Wali-e-Azam" composed by Chitragupt and written by Ahmed Wasi.

However, Talat who was one of the first Indian singer to go on foreign concert tours in 1956 to East Africa, United States, the UK, West Indies. He performed in Royal Albert Hall in London, Madison Square Garden in the United States and in the West Indies. He continued singing until 1991, when he toured the Netherlands.

Family 
Talat married a Bengali Christian girl from Calcutta, who also acted in films and was a great fan of his, Latika Mullick, later named Nasreen on  20 February 1951 and had two children Khalid born in 1953 and Sabina born in 1959.

His grand-niece and well known journalist is Sahar Zaman. She has started a special multi-performance tribute platform called Jashn-e-Talat, dedicated to Talat Mahmood's career.

Personality 
People, who were close to Talat, describe his nature as a quiet one. It is often remarked that he was a decent man, and his velvety and silky voice also reflected that decency and sense of calmness. Music directors, who worked with him, claimed that while listening to him, one would develop the feeling that Talat was a soft-hearted man. Dilip Kumar termed Talat as "a perfect gentleman". Veteran Indian film music director Mohammed Zahur Khayyam is reportedly quoted as saying, "He was a perfect gentleman. With him there was no loose talk. He was always well-dressed: his shoes shining and his trousers perfectly creased."

Available work 
Talat sang approximately 750 songs in 12 languages spread over 4 decades spanning between the 1940s and 1980s. He recorded his first song back in 1941.

Popular singles 
Some of his most memorable songs from Indian cinema are:

In his personal visit to Dhaka in 1960, he sang two beautiful Bengali songs for the film Rajdhanir Bukey directed by Ehtesham and music director Robin Ghosh.

Death
Talat Mahmood died on 9 May 1998.

In 2018, an event was arranged in New Delhi to pay tribute to Talat Mahmood on his 20th death anniversary. This was called Jashn-e-Talat and marked the start of an ongoing tribute festival curated by his grand-niece Sahar Zaman

References

External links 

 Website on Talat Mahmood, created by his singer son Khalid Mahmood
 'King Of Ghazals' Talat Mahmood
 

1924 births
1998 deaths
Indian male playback singers
Recipients of the Padma Bhushan in arts
Indian male ghazal singers
Singers from Lucknow
Indian male film actors
20th-century Indian male actors
20th-century Indian male singers
20th-century Indian singers
Male actors from Lucknow